Renyi Zhang is an American geoscientist, currently a University Distinguished Professor and Harold G. Haynes Chair at Texas A&M University and an Elected Fellow of the American Association for the Advancement of Science and American Geophysical Union.

References

Year of birth missing (living people)
Living people
Fellows of the American Association for the Advancement of Science
Texas A&M University faculty
American geochemists